The Ettingshausen effect (named for Albert von Ettingshausen) is a thermoelectric (or thermomagnetic) phenomenon that affects the electric current in a conductor when a magnetic field is present.

Ettingshausen and his PhD student Walther Nernst were studying the Hall effect in bismuth, and noticed an unexpected perpendicular current flow when one side of the sample was heated. This is also known as the Nernst effect. Conversely, when applying a current (along the y-axis) and a perpendicular magnetic field (along the z-axis) a temperature gradient appears along the x-axis. Because of the Hall effect, electrons are forced to move perpendicular to the applied current. Due to the accumulation of electrons on one side of the sample, the number of collisions increases and a heating of the material occurs.
This effect is quantified by the Ettingshausen coefficient P, which is defined as:

where  is the temperature gradient that results from the y-component Jy of an electric current density (in ) and the z-component Bz of a magnetic field.

In bismuth  the Ettingshausen coefficient is several orders of magnitude larger because of its poor thermal conductivity, .

See also
Hall effect

References

Walther Nernst
Thermoelectricity
Electrodynamics